Hlohovec is a municipality and village in Břeclav District in the South Moravian Region of the Czech Republic. It has about 1,300 inhabitants. Hlohovec is located within the Lednice–Valtice Cultural Landscape, a UNESCO World Heritage Site.

History
The first written mention of Hlohovec is from 1414, however it was probably founded already in the 13th century. The Hraniční Château was built in 1826.

References

External links

 

Villages in Břeclav District